The Austrian town of Ilz is located at 47° 05' N, 15° 56' O and approx. 300 m above sea level, at the Left Bank of the river Ilz, in the 1 km wide and fruitful Ilz valley, 43 km to the east of Graz, 19 km to the east of Gleisdorf, and 13 km to the west of Fürstenfeld. It was named first in a writ issued on 14 October 1265 in Graz by Herbord of Fullnstein, who was sewer of bishop Bruno of Olmütz. In this writ a witness is mentioned: Dominus Wernherus de Ylnz, probably the vicar of that town.

Places of interest

Buildings
The main attraction is the baroque church.

In the 1980s the decay of the castle was imminent but the actual owners are restoring and adapting the building. The oldest part - the tower - was built around 1200.

There are further castles in the immediate vicinity: the castle of Kalsdorf, the castle of Benndorf, and the castle of Uhlheim.

Economy and infrastructure

Traffic
Ilz is situated near the Southern freeway (Exit 138) and at the Gleisdorfer highway (B65). It is starting point of the Gleichenberger highway (B66).

Twin city
Ruderting

References

External links
www.ilz.at

Cities and towns in Hartberg-Fürstenfeld District